Vodno is a mountain in North Macedonia. It is located in the northern part of the country, to the southwest of the capital city Skopje. The highest point of the mountain is at Krstovar peak, on 1066 meters and the submontane is on 337 meters (Middle Vodno is on 557 m). In 2002, on Krstovar peak the Millennium Cross was built, one of the biggest Christian Crosses in the world.

Climate

The climate in Vodno is cold and temperate. Vodno has a significant amount of rainfall during the year. This is true even for the driest month.

Hydrography

Vodno has a heterogeneous hydrographic web: streams, vaults, waterfalls, springs. Vodno has a lot of streams which are used by the shepherds for feeding their goats and for watering the wild chestnuts.

Vodno has two types of vaults

Arterial
Well water

The objects that are on a higher above sea level are using the arterial underground water, and the objects that are placed on lower above sea level use the well water ones.

The water is bacteriologically and chemically clean.

Vodno has a mini waterfall which is 15 meters high and is more active in spring when the snow coverlet is melting.

Vodno has a lot of springs too that are used for the need of the local people.

Vegetation

From vegetation on Vodno mountain you can find deciduous and evergreen plants.

From the deciduous you can find the wild chestnut, lime tree, oak etc.

The evergreen plants are in bigger number related to the deciduous one. From the evergreen plants you can find the pine from the both sides of the mountain. In smaller number there are the juniperus and the boxwood.

Fauna

Animals:

Small animals: partridge, rabbit, fox, squirrel, marten, snake, birds of smaller type and insects.
Larger animals: boar, wolf, deer.

Vodno today

Although Vodno is a significant tourist center, the revenues from tourism are relatively low.

Tourism

The tourism on Vodno mountain can be divided in:

Recreational tourism
Cultural tourism
Modern Tourism

Recreational Tourism

On Vodno mountain one of the most impressive destinations is the waterfall "Prskalo" However, there are many other sights and activities to experience.

One of them is the village of Dolno Sonje, which is one of the most beautiful sights around the mountain. The small village, made on the side of the mountain, was historically inhabited by local hunters. Recently it has attracted people from Skopje, who have a weekend house or have permanently relocated there, due to its proximity to the capital and its clean air, beautiful surroundings, and medieval churches.

Additionally the hike from Middle Vodno (557 m) to the Krstovar Peak (1066 m), where the Millennium Cross is located, has become a highly attractive leisure activity. The increase in interest in this activity can be attributed to the opening of a bus-line that makes round-trips from the Skopje City Centre to Middle Vodno, as well as the availability of cable transport from Middle Vodno to Krstovar Peak.

Cultural Tourism

Various manifestations, churches, monasteries and monuments can be found on Vodno.

Churches and Monasteries
Churches:
 Saint Spas - Dolno Sonje
 Saint Spas - Sopishte
 Saint Mina - Sopishte
 Saint Nicolas - Gorno Sonje
 Saint Panteleimon - Dolno Nerezi
Monasteries:
 Saint Panteleimon - Nerezi
 Saint Trifun - 5 km from Vodno

The Churches are an important part of the cultural-historical heritage, and have remained there for years. The older churches and monasteries are very significant because they have kept their authenticity, due to not having been reconstructed, but rather having survived through the ages. They attract more visitors due to their historical significance.

Manifestations

 Christmas Eve Celebration
 Setting for seasonal motorsport events in hillclimb discipline
 Eco Projects

Monuments

 Millennium Cross
 Big Stone
 War Caves from the 1940
 Destroyed houses from 1944
 Remnant war objects from 1950

The monuments are the most visited attractions on Mount Vodno. One of the most distinct landmarks on Mount Vodno is the Millennium Cross. Found on the peak of Mount Vodno, and standing at 66 metres high, it is one of the most visited locations in the Skopje region. It was constructed in 2002, in order to commemorate 2000 years since the birth of Christ, and serves as a memorial of two millennia of Christianity.

Cable car

As of 2011, a gondola lift has been in operation to allow an easy ascent to visit the Millennium Cross. The ropeway includes 28 regular gondolas for eight persons and two VIP gondolas for four people. The lift starts at Middle Vodno and ends at the Millennium Cross.
The route is 1,750m long, with the ride lasting 6–8 minutes.

See also

 Millennium Cross Cable Car
 Millennium Cross
 Skopje
 North Macedonia

External links

Geography of Skopje
Mountains of North Macedonia